The 2019-20 Michigan State Spartans men's ice hockey season was the 79th season of play for the program and the 30th season in the Big Ten Conference. The Spartans represented Michigan State University and were coached by Danton Cole, in his 3rd season.

Roster

As of September 3, 2019.

Standings

Schedule and Results

|-
!colspan=12 style=";" | Exhibition

|-
!colspan=12 style=";" | Regular Season

|-
!colspan=12 style=";" | 

|-
!colspan=12 style=";" | 

|- align="center" bgcolor="#e0e0e0"
|colspan=12|Michigan State Lost Series 0–2

Scoring Statistics

Goaltending statistics

Rankings

References

External links

Michigan State Spartans men's ice hockey seasons
Michigan State Spartans
Michigan State Spartans
Michigan State Spartans
Michigan State Spartans